Fred Johnston (born 1951) is an Irish poet, novelist, literary critic and musician. He is the founder and current director of the Western Writers' Centre in Galway. He co-founded the Irish Writers' Co-operative in 1974, and founded Galway's annual Cúirt International Festival of Literature in 1986.

Life 
Johnson was born in Belfast, Northern Ireland, into a mixed, unorthodox background: his father's side were Belfast, Methodist, and both Unionist and Trade unionist; his mother's side were Dublin, Catholic, followers of Michael Collins and admirers of the Queen. He spent the first seven years of his life in Toronto, Canada.

He went to St Malachy's College's grammar school in Belfast from 1962–68. During these years he learnt guitar and banjo and listened to and played folk music. He performed on the cabaret lounge circuit, made appearances on Ulster TV, released some singles and, aged 16, an LP of rebel and football songs called The Flags Are Out for Celtic.

After school he moved to Dublin and worked in journalism, writing for the Evening Press and The Belfast Telegraph, and in Public Relations. He had several prose pieces published in the New Irish Writing section (edited by David Marcus) of the Evening Press, and won a Hennessy Literary Award (the judges being V. S. Pritchett and James Plunkett) in 1972.

In 1974 he met up with Neil Jordan and Peter Sheridan to found the Irish Writers' Co-operative, a publishing outlet for new Irish fiction. Early publications under its imprint Co-op Books were Desmond Hogan's The Ikon Maker (1976) and Ronan Sheehan's Tennis Players (1977).

He moved to Galway in 1978 and in 1979 published his first collection of poems, Life and Death in the Midlands, and a collection of short stories, Picture of a Girl in a Spanish Hat.

From the early 1980s to the mid 1990s, Johnston contributed poetry and a short story to the Scottish international literature, arts and affairs magazine, Cencrastus. 

In 1986 he founded the poetry festival Cúirt, which became an annual literary festival in Galway and is now one of the largest of its kind in Ireland. He ended his association with it in 1988.

In the 1990s he formed an Irish traditional folk group, Parson's Hat, which released two albums: Cutty Wren and The Better Match. Tracks by the group have been included on a number of compilation albums.

In 2000 he received the Prix de l'Ambassade Translation bursary to work on translations of the French poet Michel Martin. He has also translated the Senegalese poet Babacar Sall, and more recently the Breton poet Colette Wittorski.

In 2004 he received The Ireland Fund of Monaco bursary to be writer-in-residence for a month at the Princess Grace Irish Library in Monaco, where he continued working on his novel-in-progress The Neon Rose (published 2007), wrote some new poems, and sourced some Monégasque poems which he later translated.

In 2005 he founded the Western Writers' Centre, or in Irish Ionad Scríbhneoiri Chaitlín Maude (the Caitlín Maude Writers' Centre, after the Galway Gaeltacht poet), which bills itself as "the only writers' centre West of the Shannon". The centre holds readings, lectures, workshops and courses, and organises the Gort literary festival.

He has released two solo albums, Get You and Local Papers.

Johnston has been a regular poetry reviewer for Poetry Ireland Review and Books Ireland and on occasion for the Southern Humanities Review, The Irish Times and Harpers & Queen, and has contributed to the literary magazines Orbis, New Letters, The Southern Review, The Seneca Review, and Irish Studies Review.

Books

Poetry 
 Life and Death in the Midlands (Enniskerry: Tansy Books, 1979) OCLC 22526179
 A Scarce Light (Dublin: Beaver Row Press, 1985) 
 Song at the Edge of the World (Galway: Salmon Poetry, 1987) 
 Measuring Angles (with cassette) (Spiddal: Cló Iar-Chonnachta, 1993) 
 Browne (Belfast: Lapwing Publications, 1993) 
 Canzoni con Accompagnamento d'Arpa (Songs for Harp Accompaniment, translated into Italian by Daniele Serafini) (Faenza: MobyDick, 1996) OCLC 35075289 
 True North (Cliffs of Moher: Salmon Poetry, 1998) 
 Being Anywhere: New & Selected Poems (Belfast: Lagan Press, 2001) 
 Paris Without Maps (Dingwall: Sandstone Press, 2003) 
 The Oracle Room (Blaenau Ffestiniog: Cinnamon Press, 2007)

Novels 
 Atalanta: A Novel (Cork: The Collins Press, 2000) 
 Mapping God = Le Tracé de Dieu (in English and French) (Galway: Wynkin deWorde, 2003) 
 The Neon Rose (Bristol: Bluechrome Publishing, 2007)

Short Stories 
 Picture of a Girl in a Spanish Hat (Enniskerry: Tansy Books, 1979) OCLC 19678188
 Keeping the Night Watch (Cork: The Collins Press, 1998) 
 Dancing in the Asylum (Cardigan: Parthian Books, 2011)

Plays 
 No Earthly Pole

Translations 
 Northern Lights (poems by Colette Wittorski, from French) (Belfast: Lapwing Publications, 2007)

Notes

External links
 The Western Writers' Centre – Home Page

1951 births
Living people
Male poets from Northern Ireland
Guitarists from Northern Ireland
Irish male guitarists
Translators from Northern Ireland
French–English translators
Male novelists from Northern Ireland